The State President's Guard was the previous name of the National Ceremonial Guard, a guard unit for the South African State President and guard of honour at ceremonial occasions.

History
Until and throughout State President Charles Robberts Swart's term of office, no permanent Guard existed. On his retirement from office on 31 May 1967, plans were made for the Guard to appear in public for the first time.  The unit was established officially on 1 May 1967 and an effort was made to train the specially selected servicemen who would form this guard of honour. Special uniforms were manufactured. Due to the State President elect's illness, the Guard could only make its first public appearance eight months later at his State funeral.

President P. W. Botha changed the name of the unit to the "State President's Unit" in 1983.  It has been through some changes of name as well as being temporarily disbanded ahead of negotiations that led to the first democratic elections in 1994 and is now called the National Ceremonial Guard (NCG).

Function
The most important ceremonial function of the State President's Guard was that of guard of honour. Appearances of the Guard in this capacity included the following:

 the inauguration of State Presidents;
 visits from foreign heads of State, as well as other eminent foreign visitors;
 performances at the state funerals of State Presidents and at certain other military funerals.

Regular performances also took place at occasions when foreign ambassadors presented their credentials to the State President. Other appearances were when national states officially gain independence. In addition, the Guard also performed at the official arrival and departure of the State President from various cities, especially those cities in which his official residences were situated.

The Unit was also responsible for a weekly changing of the guard parade on Fridays at Tuynhuys in Cape Town while Parliament was in session. At the end of each month, a retreat ceremony was held by the Unit at a public venue. Similar parades were held at the Castle, Grand Parade in Cape Town and at the Union Buildings in Pretoria.

Symbols

Colours 
On 28 April 1988, history was made by the guard as it became the first unit in  the SADF to be awarded National Colours together with unit Colours in a Presentation of Colours ceremony. "National Colours", serve the same purpose as King's colours in the British Army as well as "Presidential Colors" in India and other Commonwealth republics.

Uniform

Insignia

See also 
 State President of South Africa
 South African Army
 Guard of honour
 National Ceremonial Guard
 Bands of the South African National Defence Force

Notes

References

Disbanded military units and formations in Pretoria
Military units and formations of South Africa in the Border War
South African ceremonial units